= Class kappa-ell function =

In control theory, it is often required to check if a nonautonomous system is stable or not. To cope with this it is necessary to use some special comparison functions. Class $\mathcal{KL}$ functions belong to this family:

Definition: A continuous function $\beta : [0, a) \times [0, \infty) \rightarrow [0, \infty)$ is said to belong to class $\mathcal{KL}$ if:

- for each fixed $s$, the function $\beta(r,s)$ belongs to class kappa;
- for each fixed $r$, the function $\beta(r,s)$ is decreasing with respect to $s$ and is s.t. $\beta(r,s) \rightarrow 0$ for $s \rightarrow \infty$.

== See also ==
- Class kappa function
- H. K. Khalil, Nonlinear systems, Prentice-Hall 2001. Sec. 4.4, Def. 4.3.
