= Class kappa function =

In control theory, it is often required to check if a nonautonomous system is stable or not. To cope with this it is necessary to use some special comparison functions. Class $\mathcal{K}$ functions belong to this family:

Definition: a continuous function $\alpha : [0, a) \rightarrow [0, \infty)$ is said to belong to class $\mathcal{K}$ if:

- it is strictly increasing;
- it is s.t. $\alpha(0) = 0$.

In fact, this is nothing but the definition of the norm except for the triangular inequality.

Definition: a continuous function $\alpha : [0, a) \rightarrow [0, \infty)$ is said to belong to class $\mathcal{K}_{\infty}$ if:

- it belongs to class $\mathcal{K}$;
- it is s.t. $a = \infty$;
- it is s.t. $\lim_{r \rightarrow \infty} \alpha(r) = \infty$.

A nondecreasing positive definite function $\beta$ satisfying all conditions of class $\mathcal{K}$ ($\mathcal{K}_{\infty}$) other than being strictly increasing can be upper and lower bounded by class $\mathcal{K}$ ($\mathcal{K}_{\infty}$) functions as follows:

$$\beta(x)\frac{x}{x+1}< \beta(x)<\beta(x)\left(\frac{x}{x+1}+1\right)=\beta(x)\frac{2x+1}{x+1}, \qquad x\in(0,a). \,$$

Thus, to proceed with the appropriate analysis, it suffices to bound the function of interest with continuous nonincreasing positive definite functions. In other words, when a function belongs to the ($\mathcal{K}_{\infty}$) it means that the function is radially unbounded.

== See also ==
- Class kappa-ell function
